Ilia Zedginidze (born 20 January 1977) is a Georgian former rugby union player. He played as a lock (rugby union), number 8, and flanker (rugby union) and was a lineout specialist. A member of their inaugural World Cup side in 2003, he captained the Georgia national rugby union team in the 2007 tournament, but was forced out of the squad because of an injury. This injury ultimately led to his announcement of his retirement from international rugby, after gaining 48 caps. He returned to the squad in late 2008, playing against Scotland A and taking part in the 2009 European Nations Cup, where he scored a game-saving try against Portugal on 14 February 2009.

He played for Rugby Rovigo in Italy and for FC Auch Gers in France, who played in and won the 2006-07 Rugby Pro D2 season. He now represents Aix-en-Provence.

References

1977 births
Living people
Rugby union players from Georgia (country)
Expatriate rugby union players from Georgia (country)
Expatriate rugby union players in France
Expatriate sportspeople from Georgia (country) in France
Georgia international rugby union players
Rugby union locks